Richard Munro Fox   (born 5 June 1960 in Winsford, Somerset) is a British slalom canoeist who competed for Great Britain from the late 1970s to the mid-1990s. He won eleven medals at the ICF Canoe Slalom World Championships with ten golds (K1: 1981, 1983, 1985, 1989, 1993; K1 team: 1979, 1981, 1983, 1987, 1993) and a bronze (K1: 1979). Fox also won the overall World Cup title three times (1988, 1989, 1991) and the Euro Cup (discontinued competition) four times.

Fox also finished fourth in the K1 event at the 1992 Summer Olympics in Barcelona.

Early life and canoeing beginnings

Fox was born in Somerset, England, but moved to Harpenden, Hertfordshire, in his younger years. His father, Roger Fox, an official with the British Canoe Union, was one of the founder members in 1970, with Ron Vessey and Richard Scaife, of the St Albans and District Canoe Club. Fox attended St Albans Boys' Grammar School (later to become Verulam School) from 1971 and started attending his father's canoe rolling sessions at the Cottonmill Swimming Baths from the age of 11. His initial interest was purely recreational and Fox would go on canoeing trips with other club paddlers in boats he and his father had built together. In 1975 Fox began slalom training with the club at Dobbs Weir in Hoddesden and at Sharnbrook in Bedfordshire. Fox was reluctant but eventually by 1976 got involved in racing and made the British Junior Canoe Slalom team as a reserve.

Racing career

Despite finishing outside the top 20 in his first races, Fox impressed with his obvious speed. His problem in the early years was the number of penalty points he accrued for hitting gates. In early 1977, Pete Keane (a member of the senior British C1 team) got Fox a place at the Spring senior training camp in Matlock, Derbyshire, where Fox impressed the renowned technical coach Ken Langford and began, what was to become, a long and successful relationship. At the first race of the season on the River Tay at Grandtully in Scotland, to the disbelief of other paddlers, Fox went faster than the current British No.1 and future world champion, Albert Kerr, but again suffered from too many penalty points. Nevertheless, throughout the course of the year Fox qualified for the 4-man team to go the World Championships in Spittal (where Kerr won the first of his World Championships).

After these early successes, Fox's paddling went into decline. He was determined to spend some time on his A-Level studies and avoid being thrown out of school and his kayaking performance was plagued by crashing into too many gates, causing him to miss out on selection for the British team in 1978. The underlying belief in his ability prompted Fox and Langford to begin a new programme of mental analysis and rehearsal of gate technique that was eventually to lead to Fox becoming the master of his event for over a decade. First, he moved to Stone in Staffordshire where, in late 1977, UK Sport had established one of a number of sporting 'Centres of Excellence' in an attempt to improve international sporting performance. After initial difficulties trying to remain motivated and focused while working 10-hour days as a labourer, Fox was offered a job with the Centre undertaking a 6-month facilities survey: effectively he was given money to become a full-time canoeist. The intense training programme devised by Langford paid off and Fox achieved a bronze medal in the K1 Individual class at the World Championships in Jonquierre, as well as a team gold, before going on to win his first individual World Championships at Bala in 1981.

In 1979 Fox enrolled as a Physical Education student at Birmingham University in England and benefited from one of the early sports scholarship programmes being developed by UK universities such as Bath, Stirling and Birmingham. He received a $10,000 grant in 1980 to suspend his studies and continue his paddle training in preparation for the 1981 World Championships. Langford and Fox worked on perfecting Fox's technique of "speed through precision" which not only propelled him to success but produced a World Championship winning team with Wain and Kerr. From 1979 to 1993 Fox won either individual gold or team gold or both, in the K1 Class, at every World Championships except for 1991. At the Barcelona 1992 Summer Olympics, Fox finished fourth in the K1 Slalom. He was awarded an MBE for his services to British sport in the 1986 Birthday Honours.

World Cup individual podiums

Equipment

Fox originally paddled Pyranha designed kayaks but when Graham Mackereth and Pyrahna pulled out of composite race boats to focus on the developing plastic, later roto moulded constructions, Fox moved to Mike Dalton and Nomad. Here he had his biggest success paddling the revolutionary Pro Am Extra before moving subsequently into the Extreme. Fox stayed with Nomad until it went bankrupt when he then transferred to Perception where he paddled a Reflex, a newly designed kayak which was launched shortly after Fox joined Perception, with whom he stayed for the remainder of his racing career.

Post-racing career

He moved to Australia in 1998 to take up a position as the National Head Coach for the Sydney Olympics. Richard's intervention in a worldwide campaign had been instrumental in preventing canoeing from being axed from the 2000 Sydney Olympics after the Australian Olympic Committee determined there to be inadequate facilities and insufficient funds to address the requirements for hosting an Olympic slalom competition. The result of Fox' campaigning was the construction of the Penrith Whitewater Stadium in western Sydney. From 2001, Richard was also the Australian Institute of Sport and National Team Head Coach leading the slalom team at the 2004 Summer Olympics.

Fox was appointed National Performance Director of Australian Canoeing in January 2005 and is now responsible for the Australian Slalom and Sprint High Performance programs through to the 2008 Summer Olympics.

He was a member of the ICF Slalom technical committee from 1996 to 2000 and played an active role in the International Canoe Federation (ICF) campaign to include Slalom in the Sydney 2000 Olympic program. Fox serves as second vice-president of the ICF.

Family

His wife, Myriam Fox-Jerusalmi, competed as a slalom canoeist for France while his sister Rachel Crosbee competed for Britain in the same event. Fox's daughter Jessica Fox won gold in the girls' K1 slalom event at the 2010 Youth Olympic Games. In the K1 Slalom event at the 2012 Summer Olympics in London, England, Jessica, at the age of 18, gained revenge against the 44-yr-old Czech paddler Štěpánka Hilgertová who had beaten her mother Myriam to the K1 gold medal in the Atlanta Summer Olympics in 1996, sixteen years earlier when Jessica was only 2-years-old. Jessica came second in the final of the K1, improving on her mother's bronze from Atlanta 1996 and her father's 4th in Barcelona 1992 to earn the immediate nickname from her teammates and the press of "the Silver Fox". Her father, Richard, was at the end of the course to congratulate her. Jessica's mother Miriam stated in an interview with her daughter after the race, "she's better than I was... there's not another 18-yr-old in the world that's of her standard". Richard was already at the end of his competitive career in 1992 when whitewater slalom canoeing first became a regular Olympic event (it had been a one-off demonstration event at the 1972 Munich Olympics), so it's difficult to assess what his medal tally might have been in Moscow (1980), Los Angeles (1984), and Seoul (1988), but he was 21 when he won his first individual World Championship title, compared to Jessica's Olympic success at 18. Richard and Miriam believe Jessica (the silver) Fox could go on to eclipse both of them.

His younger daughter Noemie Fox is also a slalom canoeist.

References

ICF Executive Committee featuring Fox

External links

1960 births
English emigrants to Australia
English male canoeists
Canoeists at the 1992 Summer Olympics
Living people
Members of the Order of the British Empire
Olympic canoeists of Great Britain
Sportspeople from Somerset
People from Winsford
British male canoeists
Medalists at the ICF Canoe Slalom World Championships